Tavilan-e Olya (also Romanized as Ţavīlān-e ‘Olyā; also known as Ţavīlān-e Bālā) is a village in Kolyai Rural District, in the Central District of Asadabad County, Hamadan Province, Iran. At the 2006 census, its population was 450, in 103 families.

References 

Populated places in Asadabad County